Guilty is the first full-length studio album from hardcore punk  band, Straight Faced. It was released in September, 1995 on Fearless Records.

Track listing

Personnel
Straight Faced
 Johnny Miller – vocals
 Kevin Grossman – guitar
 Damon Beard – guitar
 Sam Marrs – bass
 Ron Moeller – drums
Production
 Recorded & Produced by Jim Goodwin
 Cover Art by Tim Martin
 Layout by Craig Olivas Design
 Photos by Phil White & Alexis Longo

References

External links
Fearless Records album page

Fearless Records albums
1995 albums
Straight Faced albums